is a Japanese special effects studio founded in 1963 by special effects wizard Eiji Tsuburaya and was run by his family, until October 2007, when the family sold the company to advertising agency TYO Inc.  The studio is best known for producing the Ultra Series.  Since 2007, the head office has been located in Hachimanyama, Setagaya, Tokyo.

History 

First established in 1963, it was responsible for the creation of such classic shows as Ultraman (and its many sequels), Kaiju Booska and many other spectacular tokusatsu family/children's shows.

The company's current logo was originally the arrow-like logo from their 1968 TV series, Mighty Jack, designed by that show's art director, Tohl Narita. Tohl Narita left the company the same year.

The company, when first formed in 1963, was called . In 1968, Toho Company Ltd. forced the company to change its name to the simpler "Tsuburaya Productions", not only because its executives thought Eiji was acting as though only he could have done special effects, but also because they felt that his own TV shows were becoming a strong competition to the movies he was doing for them. Although Eiji had strong political power at Toho, he and the company were at odds with each other until his death in 1970.

Tsuburaya's more recent work includes the "Ultra N-Project" (Ultraman the Next and Ultraman Nexus) based loosely on an unused concept which was planned before the production of Ultra Q, but never actually filmed.

Tsuburaya has officially made their Ultraman and non-Ultraman content widely available on their YouTube channel, even simulcasting several of their series with English subtitles, the channel has reached over 2 million subscribers.

Corporate buyout 
In October 2007, due to rising production costs, the Tsuburaya family sold the company to Japanese advertising agency TYO Inc., which then held an 80% stake in the company. Bandai, the main licensor of merchandise for the Ultra Series, acquired a 33.4% stake in 2007 with TYO transferring another 15.6% in 2009 giving Bandai a total of 49.9%. As a result, the old Kinuta office used by Tsuburaya as its head office was razed, and the company moved to newer facilities. Kazuo Tsuburaya, Eiji's grandson, stayed with the company on its board of directors.

In 2010, pachinko maker Fields Corporation bought out TYO's 51% stake in Tsuburaya Productions, with Bandai retaining the remaining 49%.

References 

Bibliography

External links

Tsuburaya Youtube channel
Eiji Tsuburaya Official Site

 
Bandai Namco Holdings subsidiaries
Film production companies of Japan
Special effects companies
Entertainment companies established in 1963
Japanese companies established in 1963